The 2006 Cape Verdean Football Championship season was the 26th of the competition of the first-tier football in Cape Verde. Its started on 6 May and finished on 2 July, earlier than the last season. The tournament was organized by the Cape Verdean Football Federation. Sporting Praia won their 5th title and in the following year participated in the 2007 CAF Champions League. No second place club participated in the 2007 CAF Confederation Cup.

Overview 
Three clubs returned again, FC Derby, Sporting Praia and Mindelense, some others returned in some or several years, two clubs Barreirense FC and Beira Mar competed for the first time.

FC Derby was the defending team of the title. A total of 11 clubs participated in the competition, one from each island league and one who won the last season's title. The Santiago Island League North Zone had no championships for the 2005-06 season. No extra team participated as the season had only 11 clubs.

The season marked the last appearance of Nô Pintcha at the nationals, a club who won a lot of regional title at the time.

The biggest win and score was Derby who defeated Nô Pintcha 7-1, the second largest was Académico do Aeroporto who defeated Barreirense 6-1. Académico do Aeroporto scored 6 points against Botafogo in the semis.

Dário continued his career for his second season with the club after playing with several Portuguese clubs including Paços Ferreira. He scored a goal in second leg of the finals at the 45th minute.

Participating clubs 

 FC Derby, winner of the 2005 Cape Verdean Football Championships
 Sport Sal Rei Club, winner of the Boa Vista Island League
 Nô Pintcha, winner of the Brava Island League
 Botafogo, winner of the Fogo Island League
 Barreirense, winner of the Maio Island League
 Académico do Aeroporto, winner of the Sal Island League
 Sporting Clube da Praia, winner of the Santiago Island League (South)
 Beira Mar, winner of the Santo Antão Island League (North)
 Sporting Clube do Porto Novo, winner of the Santo Antão Island League (South)
 FC Ultramarina, winner of the São Nicolau Island League
 CS Mindelense, winner of the São Vicente Island League

Information about the clubs

League standings 
 Group A 

 Group B

Results

Final Stages

Semi-finals

Finals

Statistics 
 Top scorer: Mendes: 7 goals (of Académico do Aeroporto)
 Highest scoring match: Derby 7-1 Nô Pintcha (June 4)

See also 
 2005–06 in Cape Verdean football

Footnotes

External links 
 Homepage of the Cape Verdean Football Federation
 Complete results and rankings at rsssf.com

Cape Verdean Football Championship seasons
1
Cape